Leroy Mayfield House, also known as the Mayfield-Horn House, is a historic home located in Richland Township, Monroe County, Indiana.  It was built about 1830, and is a one-story, Greek Revival style frame dwelling with a central passage plan.  It sits on a rubble limestone foundation and the front entry is flanked by simple Doric order pilasters.

It was listed on the National Register of Historic Places in 1994.

References

Houses on the National Register of Historic Places in Indiana
Greek Revival houses in Indiana
Houses completed in 1830
Buildings and structures in Monroe County, Indiana
National Register of Historic Places in Monroe County, Indiana